Cowboy is a song by Finnish singer Alma. The song was written by Alma, Justin Tranter, Sarah Hudson and BloodPop, and produced by BloodPop. The song was released as a single on through PME Records on October 10, 2018. The music video for the single was directed by Mikka Lommi and released on October 26, 2018. The music video was nominated in the category of Video of the Year at the Emma Awards in 2019. Lyric video of the song was released on October 10, 2018. The song was in the top ten of Finland in components such as streaming, sales and radio.

Track listing

Charts

References

2018 singles
Alma (Finnish singer) songs
Song recordings produced by BloodPop
Songs written by Justin Tranter
Songs written by Alma (Finnish singer)
Songs written by Sarah Hudson (singer)
Virgin Records singles